Macrozamia reducta is a species of plant in the family Zamiaceae. It is endemic to New South Wales, Australia.

References

reducta
Endemic flora of Australia
Flora of New South Wales
Cycadophyta of Australia
Least concern flora of Australia
Taxonomy articles created by Polbot